Sociedade Esportiva e Recreativa São José, commonly known as São José-AP, or simply São José, is a Brazilian multi-sport club based in Macapá, Amapá. The club is most notable for its association football team, which last played in a professional match in September 2015. 

They competed in the Série C once.

History
The club was founded on 26 August 1946. They won the Campeonato Amapaense in 1970, 1971, 1993, 2005, 2006 and in 2009. São José competed in the Série C in 2005, when they were eliminated in the First Stage.

Stadium
Sociedade Esportiva e Recreativa São José play their home games at Estádio Milton Corrêa, commonly known as Zerão. The stadium has a maximum capacity of 10,000 people.

Honours

Football

State 

 Campeonato Amapaense
 Champions (6): 1970, 1971, 1993, 2005, 2006, 2009
 Runners-up (5): 1972, 1997, 2001, 2004, 2008

 Campeonato Amapaense U20
 Runners-up (2): 1974, 1997

Notes

References

Further reading

External links 

Football clubs in Amapá
Inactive football clubs in Brazil
Association football clubs established in 1946
1946 establishments in Brazil
Macapá